Ioakeim Martianos (1875–1955) was a Greek Orthodox bishop and author.

Martianos was an ethnic Aromanian. He was born in Moscopole, modern southern Albania, where he acquired ground level studies. He attended the Phanar Greek Orthodox College, followed by the Halki seminary in Constantinople (modern Istanbul).  Martianos was positioned at the following bishoprics:
Berat: 1911–1924
Paramythia: 1924–1925
Nea Pelagonia (Ptolemaida): 1925–1942
Kilkis: 1942–1945.
Xanthi: 1945–1953.

Martianos also composed a voluminous treatise about his native town Moscopole. This work has been described by various scholars as one of the best analysis of the town's mid-18th century destruction, although it concentrates on the Greek features of the town.

References

Bishops of the Ecumenical Patriarchate of Constantinople
1875 births
1955 deaths
People from Moscopole
Aromanians from the Ottoman Empire
Theological School of Halki alumni
Eastern Orthodox bishops in Greece